Lowell Ganz (born August 31, 1948 in New York City) is an American screenwriter, television writer, and television producer.  He is the long-time writing partner of Babaloo Mandel.

Ganz grew up in Queens, New York, attending Martin Van Buren High School in Queens Village.  He dropped out of college and moved to Los Angeles, California to pursue a career writing for sitcoms, starting with The Odd Couple.  From there, he moved on to writing for the TV series Happy Days and created two of its spin-off series, Laverne and Shirley and Joanie Loves Chachi.

In 1982, Ganz and Mandel teamed up with Happy Days actors Ron Howard and Henry Winkler to make their first film, the low-budget comedy Night Shift, which was also actor Michael Keaton's first film; Howard signed on because he wanted to start directing while Winkler wanted to move away from his image as the Fonz. Ganz's second film outing, Splash, made stars of Tom Hanks and Daryl Hannah and earned him an Academy Award nomination for Best Original Screenplay.

Ganz and Mandel went on to write several other films, four more of which were also directed by Howard, and one of which had Penny Marshall, who starred in Laverne and Shirley, as director.  Four of their films have featured Billy Crystal, three have featured Michael Keaton, two have featured Tom Hanks, and two are about baseball.  Ganz and Mandel are also widely used as Hollywood script doctors, known for their reliability and fast turnaround time.

Ganz lives in Los Angeles with his wife of more than 25 years.  They have three children.

Screenwriting credits (in Collaboration with Babaloo Mandel)

Night Shift (1982)
Splash (1984) - Oscar nomination for Best Original Screenplay
Spies Like Us (1985)
Gung Ho (1986) 
Vibes (1988)
Parenthood (1989)
City Slickers (1991)
Mr. Saturday Night (1992)
A League of Their Own (1992)
Greedy (1994)
City Slickers II: The Legend of Curly's Gold (1994)
Forget Paris (1995)
Multiplicity (1996)
Edtv (1999)
Where the Heart Is (2000)
Robots (2005)
Fever Pitch (2005) (adapted from the Nick Hornby book)
Tooth Fairy (2010)

Selected television credits 

Hiller and Diller - executive producer
Joanie Loves Chachi - creator, writer, and producer
Laverne and Shirley - co-creator, writer, and producer
Happy Days - writer and supervising producer
The Odd Couple - writer

References

External links
 

1948 births
Living people
20th-century American male writers
20th-century American screenwriters
21st-century American male writers
21st-century American screenwriters
American male television writers
Screenwriters from New York (state)
Television producers from New York City
Writers from Queens, New York